The List of shipwrecks in 1763 includes some ships sunk, wrecked or otherwise lost during 1763.

January

6 January

8 January

10 January

16 January

25 January

Unknown date

February

2 February

4 February

13 February

25 February

27 February

Unknown date

March

1 March

2 March

10 March

11 March

12 March

14 March

18 March

27 March

Unknown date

April

4 April

Unknown date

May

5 May

Unknown date

June

23 June

July

Unknown date

August

Unknown date

September

1 September

6 September

8 September

9 September

10 September

Unknown date

October

2 October

3 October

8 October

12 October

14 October

21 October

Unknown date

November

1 November

7 November

10 November

14 November

19 November

20 November

27 November

Unknown date

December

1 December

2 December

3 December

12 December

13 December

18 December

20 December

23 December

26 December

28 December

29 December

30 December

Unknown date

Unknown date

References

1763